Jessica Pels (born September 6, 1986) is an American editor-in-chief of Cosmopolitan magazine. Prior to her time at Cosmopolitan, Pels held editorial positions at The New Yorker, Vogue, Glamour and Teen Vogue. She served as digital director for Marie Claire magazine from November 2014 until January 2018, when she became digital director of Cosmopolitan. In October 2018, Pels was named editor-in-chief of Cosmopolitan, becoming the youngest person in the history of the magazine to hold the position at the age of 32.

Early life and background
Pels grew up in Atlanta, Georgia, U.S. She first moved to New York City at the age of 14 to study ballet at the American Ballet Theatre. Pels earned a Bachelor of Fine Arts degree in film production at the New York University Tisch School of the Arts.

Career

Early editing career
After graduating, Pels interned at The New Yorker and then Vogue. She later began working as an editorial assistant at Condé Nast. Pels served as the assistant to Glamour editor-in-chief Cindi Leive before being promoted to assistant editor a year later, and then associate editor at Glamour. She became the print features editor at Teen Vogue in March 2013. In November 2014, Pels joined Hearst Magazines as digital director at Marie Claire, where she served for three years. At Marie Claire she spearheaded features on a wide range of women's topics from profiles of the women who guard our nuclear weapons, to an essay on feminism from Canadian Prime Minister Justin Trudeau.

Cosmopolitan
In January 2018, Pels was appointed digital director of Cosmopolitan magazine. By the end of May she had revamped the magazine's digital presence. Cosmopolitan saw an increase in traffic from 15 million visitors a year in February 2018 to 41 million visitors a year later, and digital subscriptions grew 185% from 85,060 to 242,075 between December 2016 and December 2018. In October 2018, Pels was named editor-in-chief of Cosmopolitan, becoming the youngest in the history of the magazine to hold the position at the age of 32. As editor-in-chief, Pels oversees the print magazine, website, video, social, Snapchat and product extensions of the brand.

In the media
In 2019, Pels was named Adweek's Editor of the Year. She is a frequent speaker on topics including millennial culture, women in politics, career growth, mentorship, and more. In June 2019 she spoke about the gender pay gap at the Forbes summit. In July 2019, she made multiple appearances on MSNBC, talking about the importance of healthcare to millennials in the 2020 election.

References

1986 births
Living people
American magazine editors
Women magazine editors
Cosmopolitan (magazine) editors
American women journalists
Writers from Atlanta